The Serbia and Montenegro men's national under 20 ice hockey team was the national under-20 ice hockey team in Serbia and Montenegro. The team represented Serbia and Montenegro at the International Ice Hockey Federation's IIHF World U20 Championship.

References

Junior national ice hockey teams
Former national ice hockey teams
National sports teams of Serbia and Montenegro